Keith Blake (born 10 May 1950), better known as Prince Alla (sometimes Prince Allah or Ras Allah) is a Jamaican roots reggae singer whose career began in the 1960s, and has continued with a string of releases into the 2000s.

Biography
Born in St. Elizabeth, and raised in Greenwich Town, Kingston, Jamaica, Blake's career began in the vocal group The Leaders with Milton Henry and Roy Palmer, who recorded three tracks for producer Joe Gibbs in the late 1960s. When The Leaders broke up, Blake continued to work with Gibbs, who issued his debut solo release, "Woo Oh Oh". Blake had been interested in the Rastafari movement since he had a vision as a child, and in 1969, Blake's Rastafarian faith saw him get heavily involved in Jamaica's camp community, withdrawing from the music scene and living in Prince Emmanuel Edwards' camp at Bull Bay. He re-entered the music scene in the mid-1970s, releasing a single "Born a Fighter" for producer Teddy Powell, before working with Bertram Brown's Freedom Sounds, with a series of recordings, now under the name Prince Alla, that are now regarded as roots reggae classics, such as "Sun Is Shining", "Bucket Bottom", "Lot's Wife", and "Stone". He also recorded for producer Tapper Zukie, including the album Heaven Is My Roof. Continuing interest in his work saw the release of two albums of material from the 1970s on Blood & Fire records, Only Love Can Conquer and I Can Hear The Children Singing, which brought his work to a new audience. Alla continued to release records occasionally through the 1980s and 1990s, including an album with Jah Shaka. Alla has continued to be in demand with digital roots producers, and has released several albums with the  likes of Jah Warrior. Since 2010 Prince Alla is touring the world with Rockers Agency and stays in popular demand for live performances across the globe.

Albums
Heaven Is My Roof (1979), Imp
The Best of Prince Alla (1980), Redemption Sounds, reissued as Great Stone (1984), High Times
King of the Road (1982), Ital International, reissued as Showcase (1984), Vista
Jah Children Gather Round (1996), Jah Shaka
Sweet Sensation Corner Stone
Only Love Can Conquer (1997), Blood & Fire
Lion a Go Bite Yu (1999), Headphone Music
Glory (2000), Jah Warrior
One Bright Day (2002), Back Yard
More Love (2002), Jah Warrior
I Can Hear The Children Singing (2002), Blood & Fire
Archive Recordings Showcase Volume 1 (2009), Archive Recordings
Showcase  (2020), Burning Sounds Record

References

External links
Prince Alla album discography from Rootsdub
Prince Alla at Roots Archives

1950 births
Living people
Musicians from Kingston, Jamaica
Jamaican Rastafarians
Jamaican reggae musicians